Sauli Väinämö Niinistö (born 24 August 1948) is a Finnish politician who has served as president of Finland since March 2012, the 12th person to hold that office.

A lawyer by education, Niinistö was Chairman of the National Coalition Party (NCP) from 1994 to 2001, Minister of Justice from 1995 to 1996, Minister of Finance from 1996 to 2003, Deputy Prime Minister from 1995 to 2001 and the NCP candidate in the 2006 presidential election. He served as the Speaker of the Parliament of Finland from 2007 to 2011 and has been the honorary president of the European People's Party (EPP) since 2002.

Niinistö was the NCP candidate in the 2012 presidential election, defeating Pekka Haavisto of the Green League (VIHR) with 62.6% of the vote in the decisive second round. Niinistö assumed office on 1 March 2012; he is the first NCP president since Juho Kusti Paasikivi, who left office in 1956. In May 2017, Niinistö announced that he would seek reelection in the 2018 presidential election, running as an Independent candidate. The NCP and Christian Democrats (KD) supported his candidacy. He won reelection in the first round on 28 January 2018 with 62.7% of the vote and his second term began on 1 February 2018.

Early life and education

Niinistö was born in Salo in 1948. His parents were the circulation manager of Salon Seudun Sanomat Väinö Niinistö (1911–1991) and nurse Hilkka Niinistö, née Heimo (1916–2014).

Niinistö graduated from the Salon normaalilyseo high school in 1967, after which he went to study at the University of Turku. From there he graduated with a Bachelor of Laws degree in 1974.

Career 

Niinistö ran his own law firm in Salo between 1978-88 before entering national politics.

Niinistö served on the municipal council of Salo from 1977 to 1992 and was elected a Member of the Parliament of Finland from the district of Finland Proper in 1987. In 1994 he was chosen to lead the NCP as party chairman and subsequently became Justice Minister in Prime Minister Paavo Lipponen's first cabinet in 1995.

Switching portfolios, Niinistö became Finance Minister in 1996, continuing in Lipponen's second cabinet from 1999 to 2003. In both administrations, Niinistö was Deputy Prime Minister under social democrat Lipponen. As Finance Minister, Niinistö was known for his strict fiscal policy. He was the first Finn to make a purchase with euros on 1 January 2002. Niinistö was urged by his party to stand as a candidate in the 2000 presidential election, but he refused the candidacy for completely related to his private life reasons. He announced his gradual retirement from politics in 2001, and he was succeeded that year by Ville Itälä as party leader. After the end of his term as a cabinet minister in 2003, Niinistö became vice-chairman of the board of directors at the European Investment Bank.

In March 2005, Niinistö announced his candidacy for the 2006 presidential election. He represented the NCP, challenging the incumbent President Tarja Halonen. He qualified for the second round runoff (as one of the top two candidates in the first round), held on 29 January 2006, but lost to Halonen. The costs of Niinistö's campaign were circa 2,225,000 euros, including 492,864 euros and 717,191 euros contributions from NCP. His financial declaration in 2006 was made more detailed in 2009 because of controversies.

In 2006, Niinistö announced that he was standing again for the 2007 parliamentary election. He said, however, that he had no plans to take any high-ranking political job such as the prime ministership in the future. He received 60,563 votes in the 2007 elections, a record in a Finnish parliamentary election; it was about 21% more than the 1948 record of Hertta Kuusinen. After the 2007 election, Niinistö decided to accept the position of the Speaker of the Parliament. Niinistö negotiated the merger of the European Democrat Union (EDU) into the EPP in 2002 and became its Honorary President.

Niinistö was elected as the president of the Football Association of Finland on 8 November 2009, replacing Pekka Hämäläinen, But the three-year term was interrupted when Niinistö was elected president.

Presidency 

Niinistö was the NCP candidate for a second time in the 2012 presidential election. With 37.0% of the vote, he won the election's first round and faced off against Haavisto of the Green League in the decisive second round. He carried the second round with around 62.6% against Haavisto's 37.4%. Niinistö's margin of victory was larger than that of any previous directly elected president. He won a majority in 14 of 15 electoral districts. Niinistö's election budget was circa 1.2 million euros.

After becoming the President, Niinistö pledged to establish a special task force aiming at preventing alienation among the country's youth and expressed concern about the problems of sparsely populated rural areas. Niinistö stressed the significance of mutual understanding with the cabinet and Parliament. His acceptance speech thanked those who backed him in the campaign and those who disagreed with him. Niinistö said that the differing views expressed should be taken into consideration.

In May 2017, Niinistö announced that he would seek re-election in the 2018 presidential election, running as an independent candidate. His candidacy was soon supported by the National Coalition Party and Christian Democrats. In the election, Niinistö received 62.7% of the votes, becoming the first president in Finland to get elected on the first round of popular vote.

During Niinistö's presidency, neighbouring military cooperation ties between Finland and Sweden got further strengthened, culminating in the NATO accession bids for the countries being joint rather than separate. Amid threats of a veto from the Turkish government over Sweden's accession, Niinistö was steadfastily committed that the application was joint and that also would mean that Finland would decline an invitation. Finland and Sweden agreed a deal in principle that would allow the countries to join NATO with the Turkish government on 28 June 2022 in the wake of the veto threat.

Foreign policy 
As President, Niinistö visited Russia and met with Russian President Vladimir Putin in February 2013 to promote bilateral trade (e.g. Shell, Cargotec, YIT). He discussed ice hockey and business, but not human rights issues or the selling of Russian military equipment to Syria and its transport through Finland.

At the same time as the sanctions against Russia, mainly caused by the Russian invasion in Crimea and eastern Ukraine, Niinistö said that the focus should be on easing tensions and increasing understanding between Europe and Russia. He stated that Finland should serve as a broker between Russia and Europe. He also stated that "Russia understands that the conflict in Ukraine has generated debate in Finland over this country's own security policy. It's important that President Putin understands Finland's position on NATO membership in this debate. Finland accepts that Russia is working to find a solution to the acute conflict in Ukraine, but it needs to do more." In an interview with The Washington Post in January 2022, Niinistö stated that he could not speak to Putin's intentions regarding the frozen relations between Russia and the West, but cited what he described as Finnish "wisdom" on experiences in dealing with Moscow. "Finns certainly learned the wisdom that a Cossack, that means a Russian soldier, takes all that is loose. You have to be very, very, clear, where the fixed line is." When he was asked to shed light on his thoughts about Putin after the Russian attack to Ukraine on 24 February 2022, Niinistö replied: "The masks have now been taken off, showing only the face of war."

The Foreign minister of Russia Sergey Lavrov used a statement of Niinistö in his arguments about future choices for the next Prime Minister of Finland, saying, "'Does Northern Europe need this? How Russia will react?' President Niinistö asked these questions with the subtext. He knows that the answer is negative: nobody needs this"; Lavrov added "President Niinistö realizes that what happened in Ukraine is impossible in Finland."

In his New Years Speech 2015 Niinistö stated: "We condemned Russia's illegal annexation of Crimea as soon as it happened and then condemned Russia's actions in eastern Ukraine. We have done this in the EU context but have also made this clear in our direct contacts with Russia. We condemn any illegal occupations, illegal use of force or attempts to limit the sovereignty of independent nations. Such actions never achieve anything but danger and increased tension. While power may have once grown out of the barrel of a gun, these days it leads to nothing but chaos." On 16 July 2018, Niinistö officially hosted U.S. President Donald Trump and Russian President Putin for the US-Russia Summit in Helsinki. Niinistö was involved 73rd United Nations General Assembly in New York on 25 September 2018. President Niinistö spoke about Russia and Baltic nations affairs at the UNGA 2018.

Niinistö met with Iranian Supreme Leader Ali Khamenei on 26 October 2016 in Tehran, Iran. He also met Iranan President Hassan Rouhani. They discussed closer economic cooperation, human rights in Iran, the situation in the Middle East and the threat of terrorism. Niinistö said: "Iran was one of the first countries to recognise Finland’s independence, and now our countries will further deepen their cooperation."

In April 2017, Niinistö supported One-China policy. Niinistö visited China on 13–14 January 2019 and met with Chinese President Xi Jinping, they went through common issues between Finland-China to raise friendship and partnership. Xi Jinping and Niinistö jointly launched the 2019 China-Finland Year of Winter Sports. 

In 2018, Niinistö said during the election campaign that he would block arms sales to the United Arab Emirates and Saudi Arabia, due to their involvement in the Saudi Arabian–led intervention in Yemen.

In October 2019, Niinistö condemned Turkey’s military campaign in Kurdish–controlled areas of northern Syria. He said that two NATO member states are "quite involved" in Syria.

On 24 February 2022, the Russian president Putin ordered the Russian Armed Forces to begin an invasion of Ukraine. 
On 4 March 2022, Niinistö did a one day visit to Washington DC to meet President Joe Biden and number of other US politicians and security personnel. The meetings was initiated by Niinistö's office earlier the same week. In a press conference with Finnish media, Niinistö told that in the meeting the presidents discussed about the Russian invasion of Ukraine and its impact on European and Finnish security. Furthermore they agreed on deepening Finnish-US security co-operation and bilateral relations.
On 12 May 2022, ten weeks after the beginning of the invasion, president Niinistö and prime minister Sanna Marin advocated in a joint statement for a 'NATO membership without delay'. On 29 May 2022, Turkish President Recep Tayyip Erdoğan told Niinistö that "overlooking threatening terrorist organisations that pose a threat to a NATO member is not in the spirit of the alliance." On 8 June 2022, Niinistö said he was surprised by Turkey's opposition to Finland's NATO membership.

Pardons
As the President of Finland, Niinistö holds the power of pardon for individual criminal sentences and related sanctions. In 2019 and 2020, he did not pardon anyone, and has pardoned on average only three people per year. In comparison, his predecessor Tarja Halonen reached a figure of 20 pardons per year on average. Niinistö has explained that he is in good agreement with the policy of the Supreme Court of Finland, which has always processed the case first before the President sees it. Niinistö has supported the abolition of the presidential pardon in his presidential campaigns, calling the institution an outdated "royal tradition".

Personal life 

Niinistö married his first wife, Marja-Leena (née Alanko), in 1974 and they had two sons. Marja-Leena was killed in a car crash in January 1995. Niinistö wrote about the time after the death of his first wife in his book Viiden vuoden yksinäisyys (translation: "Five years of loneliness").

While a cabinet minister, Niinistö, as a widower, was romantically involved with MP Tanja Karpela, a former beauty queen and later Minister of Culture. Karpela's Centre Party was in opposition and Niinistö was considered the second-most influential man in government. In 2003 Karpela and Niinistö announced their engagement, which they ended in 2004.

In 2005, Niinistö met Jenni Haukio, who at the time worked for the National Coalition Party and interviewed Niinistö for the Nykypäivä magazine. They later became romantically involved but kept the relationship secret from the public until the wedding on 3 January 2009. In October 2017, the couple announced that they were expecting a child, and they subsequently had a son, who was born in February 2018. In 2017 Niinistö and Haukio's dog Lennu went viral across the world.

Niinistö is the uncle of Ville Niinistö, a Green League MP from Turku, former leader of the Green League and former Minister of the Environment. Whereas, ex-Minister of Defence Jussi Niinistö is not related, and their family names have different origins.

Niinistö is a survivor of the 2004 Indian Ocean earthquake. He escaped the ensuing tsunami by climbing a utility pole with his son in Khao Lak, Thailand.

Niinistö is a devout Christian and member of the Lutheran Church.

Niinistö enjoys roller skating in his spare time, and in the winter he often plays ice hockey.

Beside his native language, Niinistö also speaks English and Swedish.

Opinions 

Niinistö opposes the president's right to pardon prisoners and only pardoned one prisoner during his first year as president. He opposes same-sex marriage but thinks that same-sex couples should have the right to adoption and a common surname. He supports euthanasia under certain circumstances. In December 2017, Niinistö stated that Finland should not apply for NATO membership in the current circumstances. According to Niinistö, as a member of NATO, Finland would lose the opportunity to stay out of the crisis. However, Niinistö wondered that in the event of a crisis between Russia and the EU, Finland should consider membership very seriously.

Popular culture 
Niinistö appears as an animated character in the political satire TV series The Autocrats.

Niinistö also appears in an episode of Hyvät herrat, a popular Finnish political satire show, as a guest star.

Honours

Coat of Arms

National Orders 
: Grand Master and Commander Grand Cross with Collar of the Order of the White Rose of Finland
: Grand Master and Commander Grand Cross of the Order of the Lion of Finland
: Grand Master and Commander Grand Cross of the Order of the Cross of Liberty

Foreign Orders 
: Grand Star of the Decoration of Honour for Services to the Republic of Austria (February 2016)
: Knight of the Order of the Elephant (April 2013)
: Collar of the Order of the Cross of Terra Mariana (May 2014)
 : Grand Cross of the Order of the Legion of Honour (July 2013)
 : Grand Cross Special Class of the Order of Merit of the Federal Republic of Germany (September 2018)
: Grand Cross with Collar of the Order of the Falcon
: Grand Cross (2008), last with Collar of the Order of Merit of the Italian Republic (September 2017)
: Commander Grand Cross with Chain 1st Class of the Order of the Three Stars
: Grand Cross of the Order of Vytautas the Great with Golden Chain
: Grand Cross of the Order of the Gold Lion of the House of Nassau (May 2016)
: Grand Cross of the Order of Orange-Nassau
: Grand Cross of the Royal Norwegian Order of Merit
: Grand Cross of the Order of St. Olav (October 2012)
: Knight of the Order of White Eagle (March 2015)
: Knight (2012) with Collar (2016) of the Royal Order of the Seraphim
: Recipient of the 70th Birthday Badge Medal of King Carl XVI Gustaf (30 April 2016)
: Order of Prince Yaroslav the Wise, 1st class (2021)

Honorary doctorates 
: Honorary Doctor of Administrative Sciences – University of Tampere (2010)
: Honorary Doctor of Laws – University of Turku (2011)
: Honorary Doctor of Laws – Eötvös Loránd University (2012)
: Honorary Doctor of Sports Sciences – University of Jyväskylä (2013)
: Honorary Doctor of Veterinary Medicine – University of Helsinki (2015)
: Honorary Doctor of Economics – Aalto University School of Business (2016)
: Honorary Doctor of Laws – University of Helsinki (2017)
: Recipient of the Honorary Doctorate of Laws from the University of Minnesota (23 September 2017)
: Honorary Doctor of Military Sciences – National Defence University (2018)
: Was Honored Global Citizen Awards – Atlantic Council (2022)

References

External links

|-

|-

|-

|-

|-

1948 births
Living people
People from Salo, Finland
Presidents of Finland
Deputy Prime Ministers of Finland
Ministers of Justice of Finland
Ministers of Finance of Finland
Speakers of the Parliament of Finland
Members of the Parliament of Finland (1983–87)
Members of the Parliament of Finland (1987–91)
Members of the Parliament of Finland (1991–95)
Members of the Parliament of Finland (1995–99)
Members of the Parliament of Finland (1999–2003)
Members of the Parliament of Finland (2007–11)
European People's Party politicians
National Coalition Party politicians
Finnish Lutherans
University of Turku alumni
Grand Crosses Special Class of the Order of Merit of the Federal Republic of Germany
Commanders Grand Cross of the Order of the Lion of Finland
Grand Crosses of the Order of the Cross of Liberty
Grand Crosses with Golden Chain of the Order of Vytautas the Great
Knights Grand Cross of the Order of the Falcon
Recipients of the Order of Merit of the Italian Republic
Recipients of the Order of Orange-Nassau
Candidates for President of Finland
Recipients of the Collar of the Order of the Cross of Terra Mariana
Football Federation of Finland executives
Recipients of the Order of Prince Yaroslav the Wise, 1st class
20th-century Finnish lawyers